The Oakland Oaks were a minor professional ice hockey team based in Oakland, California that played in the Pacific Coast Hockey League from the 1944–45 season into the 1949–50 season. The team did not complete its final season, folding in December 1949. The team played its home games at Winterland Arena in San Francisco, a venue it shared with the San Francisco Shamrocks.

The team's coach for its first season was Denny Edge, who had previously coached the Gonzaga Bulldogs men's ice hockey team. Hockey Hall of Fame inductee Eddie Shore bought the team for $50,000 in May 1948 and owned it through closure. In its six-season history, the team compiled a record of 131–143–10.

References

Defunct ice hockey teams in the United States
Defunct sports teams in California
Sports teams in Oakland, California
Ice hockey clubs established in 1942
Ice hockey clubs disestablished in 1949
1942 establishments in California
1949 disestablishments in California